Watch Out Beagle's About was a British celebrity comics comic strip which appeared in the British comic book magazine Buster from 14 September 1991 until 28 December 1991. It was drawn by Anthony Hutchings.

The strip was basically a parody of the British TV show Beadle's About which was popular at the time. The main difference being that the strip was hosted by a beagle.  Sometimes the pranks would back-fire.

Sources

1991 comics debuts
1991 comics endings
Fictional dogs
Fictional television shows
Comics based on television series
Parody comics
Parodies of television shows
Comics about dogs
Comic strips based on real people
British humour comics
Fleetway and IPC Comics
British comic strips
Male characters in comics